The Czechoslovak War Cross 1939 (Československý válečný kříž 1939 in Czech, Československý vojnový kríž 1939 in Slovak) is a military decoration of the former state of Czechoslovakia which was issued for those who had provided great service to the Czechoslovak state (in exile) during the years of World War II.

Description 
On December 20, 1940, the Czechoslovak government in exile in London ordered the creation of a second version of the Czechoslovak War Cross. It was created and issued not as a general service medal, but as a meritorious decoration for those had provided great service to the Czechoslovak state during the years of World War II. The award was mainly intended for persons who had helped liberate Czechoslovakia from the rule of Nazi Germany. Several American officers received the award, such as Dwight D. Eisenhower or George S. Patton, and the decoration was also bestowed to national heroes, such as the men who had assassinated Reinhard Heydrich in operation Anthropoid.

The second Czechoslovak War Cross was known as the Czechoslovak War Cross 1939 and a common phrase for the decoration was also the Czechoslovak Croix de Guerre. In cases where an individual had received both the World War I and World War II versions, both medals could be worn simultaneously.

The validity of the War Cross was confirmed after the end of World War II, in January 1946.

There were no further versions of the Czechoslovak War Cross after 1945 and the medal became obsolete with the division of the Czechoslovak state in 1992.

Design 
The medal was dye-struck and high in detail, with a bronze finish. On the obverse of the cross there was the small state symbol of Czechoslovakia, on the reverse – symbols of the lands in circles: symbol of Bohemia in the middle, Slovakia above, Moravia on the left, Silesia on the right, and Carpatho-Ukraine below. In the spaces around the middle circle, the year 1939 is spread. The medal was suspended from a white ribbon with red and blue stripes.

Notable recipients

Clift Andrus
Omar Bradley
Aaron Bradshaw Jr.
Pierre Brossolette
Albert E. Brown
Alexandru Dobriceanu
Dwight D. Eisenhower
Jozef Gabčík
Philip De Witt Ginder
John M. Devine
Neville Duke
Barksdale Hamlett
Karel Janoušek
Geoffrey Keyes
Karel Klapálek
Jan Kubiš
Jan Linhart
Alois Liška
František Moravec
George S. Patton
John L. Pierce
Vernon Prichard
Walter M. Robertson
Cornelius E. Ryan
William R. Schmidt
Ludvík Svoboda
George A. Taylor
Georgy Zhukov
Nikita Brilev

See also 
 Czechoslovak War Cross 1918

External links 
 Czechoslovak war cross 1939

Military awards and decorations of Czechoslovakia
Awards established in 1940
Awards disestablished in 1992